Scott Joseph Lachance (born October 22, 1972) is an American former professional ice hockey defenseman who last played for the Lowell Devils of the American Hockey League.

Biography
Lachance was born in Charlottesville, Virginia and raised in Bristol, Connecticut, where he attended St. Paul Catholic High School. As a youth, he played in the 1985 and 1986 Quebec International Pee-Wee Hockey Tournaments with a minor ice hockey team from Middlesex County, Connecticut.

Lachance was named to the All-Hockey East Rookie Team in the 1990–91 season.

Lachance was selected 4th overall by the New York Islanders in the 1991 NHL Entry Draft. He played 819 career NHL games, scoring 31 goals and 112 assists for 143 points. He played in 1997 National Hockey League All-Star Game.

He has three children: Jake, Shane, and Ryan. His wife, Jaqueline, is the daughter of former Boston University hockey coach Jack Parker. 

Currently Lachance is a scout for the New Jersey Devils.

Career statistics

Regular season and playoffs

International

References

External links

1972 births
American men's ice hockey defensemen
Boston University Terriers men's ice hockey players
Columbus Blue Jackets players
Ice hockey players from Connecticut
Ice hockey people from Virginia
Ice hockey players at the 1992 Winter Olympics
EHC Kloten players
Living people
Lowell Devils players
Montreal Canadiens players
National Hockey League All-Stars
National Hockey League first-round draft picks
New Jersey Devils scouts
New York Islanders draft picks
New York Islanders players
Olympic ice hockey players of the United States
People from Bristol, Connecticut
Sportspeople from Charlottesville, Virginia
Vancouver Canucks players